Kevin De Weert (born 27 May 1982 in Duffel) is a former Belgian professional road bicycle racer. In October 2014 it was announced would join  on a two-year deal from 2015, with the team's directeur sportif Nico Verhoeven describing his role as a domestique for the team's general classification riders in stage races. De Weert retired on his 33rd birthday due to the continuing effects of injuries sustained earlier in his career. In February 2016 he succeeded Carlo Bomans as coach of the Belgian national cycling team.

Major results

1998
1st  National Under-17 Time Trial Championships
2000
1st  National Under-19 Time Trial Championships
1st Giro della Toscana U19
2001
7th Zesbergenprijs Harelbeke
2002
2nd Zesbergenprijs Harelbeke
5th Overall Tour de l'Avenir
2003
5th OZ Tour Beneden-Maas
9th Grote Prijs Stad Zottegem
2007
4th Overall Étoile de Bessèges
2010
17th Overall Tour de France
2011
10th Overall Four Days of Dunkirk

References

External links 

Belgian male cyclists
1982 births
Living people
People from Duffel
Cyclists from Antwerp Province